Leonidas Pyrgos (born 1874 in Mantineia, Arcadia; date of death unkwown) was a Greek fencer.

Career
Pyrgos was the first Greek Olympic medallist in the history of the modern Olympic Games, winning his fencing event of the 1896 Summer Olympics on 7 April 1896. His competitor in the event, which consisted of a single bout of foil fencing to three touches, was one of the best fencers in the world, the Frenchman Joanni Perronet. After a close contest, Pyrgos won 3–1. The crowd cheered the first Greek Olympic medallist. He was lifted onto their shoulders and carried throughout the streets of Athens.

References

External links

Fencers at the 1896 Summer Olympics
19th-century sportsmen
Greek male fencers
Olympic gold medalists for Greece
Olympic fencers of Greece
1874 births
Year of death missing
Olympic medalists in fencing
Medalists at the 1896 Summer Olympics
People from Mantineia
Place of death missing
Sportspeople from the Peloponnese